Cirsonella lata is a minute sea snail, a marine gastropod mollusc in the family Skeneidae.

Distribution
This marine species is endemic to Australia and occurs off New South Wales.

References

 Laseron, C. 1954. Revision of the Liotiidae of New South Wales. The Australian Zoologist 12(1): 1-25, figs 1-49a
 Iredale, T. & McMichael, D.F. 1962. A reference list of the marine Mollusca of New South Wales. Memoirs of the Australian Museum 11: 1-109

lata
Gastropods described in 1954